Jean de La Baume (dead after 25 January 1435 ) was a Marshal of France from 1422 until his death.

Functions 
He was:
 Esquire and ordinary cup-bearer of John the Fearless, Duke of Burgundy (named on 22 December 1404 in Châlon-sur-Saône) and was named Count of Montrevel-en-Bresse.
 Provost et Governor of Paris (1421-1422, see Prévôt de Paris), named by Henry V, King of England Regent of the Kingdom of France
 Marshal of France from 1422, named by Henry V, King of England Regent of the Kingdom of France

Titles 
He was:
 Count of Montrevel-en-Bresse and Sinopoli in Calabria 
 Lord of Valusin, Montgeffon, Marbos, Poissia et l'Abergement Illia, Saint-Étienne-du-Bois, Saint-Étienne-sur-Reyssouze, Mont Saint-Sorlin, Esnes-Asnières, Montfort, Irlains, Aigremont, Ormont, Marigny, Esté, Bussy, La Roche-du-Vanel, Montribloud, Coppet, Mats, Sernage et Attalens.

Honours 
  - Duchy of Orléans : Knight of the Order of the Porcupine on 17 March 1404 by Louis I, Duke of Orléans. 
  : Knight of the Order of the Collar of Savoy.

Sources 

Date of birth unknown
1435 deaths
Marshals of France
Military governors of Paris
Knights of the Order of the Porcupine